Elizabeth Moran (born 1984) is an American artist. Her work explores unseen and possibly unexplained pasts, as well as photographing what could be considered unphotographable. She has created photo series examining such subject matter as porn film sets depicted without any people present, and the exploration of supernatural activity, particularly around her mother's childhood home. Kink.com founder Peter Acworth, who welcomed Moran into the company's studios in The Armory, spoke positively of Moran's depictions, saying that her approach "shows that behind all the fantasy of the Kink is a world that is, in many ways, very normal." Her work exploring supernatural activity, which includes references to nineteenth-century “spirit photography,” caught the attention of ghost hunters who would consult with her on the possible validity of suspected photographs of ghosts.

Moran's work has been exhibited both nationally and globally, in places including Wattis Institute for Contemporary Arts in San Francisco, Headlands Center for the Arts in Sausalito, RAC Gallery in New York, Fotofest in Houston, tête in Berlin, and 72 Gallery in Tokyo. In 2014 she was included in Photo Boite's 30 Under 30 : Women Photographers exhibition. Awards include a Murphy and Cadogan Fellowship in 2012 and a Tierney Fellowship in 2013.

References

External links 
 Elizabeth Moran - Personal Site
 Photo Boite | 30 Under 30 : Women Photographers | 2014

Living people
American photographers
American contemporary artists
1984 births
21st-century American women photographers
21st-century American photographers